Anomis campanalis is a moth of the family Erebidae first described by Paul Mabille in 1880.

It is found in Madagascar and Réunion.

References

Erebidae
Moths of Africa
Moths described in 1880